The Battle of Sasireti took place in 1042 at the village of Sasireti in the present day Shida Kartli region, not far from the town of Kaspi, during the civil war in the Kingdom of Georgia. It resulted in a decisive defeat of the army of King Bagrat IV by the rebel feudal lord Liparit IV, Duke of Kldekari.

History 
A feud between Bagrat IV and his former general, Liparit Baghvashi, a powerful duke of Kldekari, erupted during their campaign against the Georgian city of Tbilisi (1037–1040), which at the time was ruled by Arab emirs. The king, advised by Liparit's opponents, made peace with Emir Ali ibn-Jafar, a sworn enemy of the duke, in 1040. In retaliation, Liparit revolted and endeavoured to put Demetre, Bagrat's half-brother, on the Georgian throne.  However, he had no success and ended hostilities with Bagrat, receiving the title of Grand Duke of Kartli, but giving up his son, Ioane, as a hostage of the king. Soon Liparit rose again in rebellion, requesting Byzantine aid. Supported by a Byzantine force and an army of Kakheti (a kingdom in eastern Georgia), he released his son and again invited the pretender prince Demetre to be crowned king. The latter died at the very beginning of the war, but Liparit continued to fight the king's forces.

The royal army commanded by King Bagrat was joined by a Varangian detachment of 1000 men, probably a subdivision of the 3000 men strong expedition of the Swedish Viking Ingvar the Far-Travelled. According to an old Georgian chronicle, they had landed at Bashi, a place by the mouth of the Rioni river, in Western Georgia.

The two armies fought a decisive battle near the village of Sasireti, eastern Georgia, in the spring of 1042. Ingvar and the Varangians charged the rebel force before King Bagrat could consolidate his army, forcing him to join the assault without any strategy. In fierce fighting, the royal army was defeated and retreated westwards. Ingvar and many of his men were captured but later released by Liparit. Every captured royalist on the other hand were tortured and maimed. However many of the vikings including Ingvar did not survive marching beyond Kutaisi as they succumbed to disease. The rebel leader proceeded to seize the key fortress of Ardanuç, thereby becoming the virtual ruler of the southern and eastern provinces of Georgia. Defeated in the battle, it was not until 1059 that Bagrat IV was able to restore his authority in the kingdom, forcing the renegade Duke Liparit into exile in Constantinople.

See also
Kldekari Fortress
Byzantine–Georgian wars
List of wars involving Georgia (country)
Military history of Georgia

Further reading

Levan Z. Urushadze. "Following the tracks of the Vikings." Yearbook of IACERHRG-2003, Tbilisi, 2004: pp. 100–101 (in English).
Levan Z. Urushadze. "Some questions of the history of Georgia of 40s of the 11th century." Georgian Source Studies, Volume 10, Tbilisi, 2004: pp. 108–112 (in Georgian, English summary).
Snorre Sturlason. "Heimskringla" (in Old Norse)

References

Sasireti 1042
Sasireti 1042
Sasireti 1042
1040s in the Byzantine Empire
Sasireti
Sasireti
1042 in Asia
1042 in Europe
11th century in the Kingdom of Georgia
Sasireti